Martin Erlandsson (born 12 February 1974) is a Swedish professional golfer.

Career
Erlandsson was a top amateur golfer, representing Sweden in the 1996 Eisenhower Trophy before turning professional the following year. He joined the Challenge Tour, where he spent seven seasons before winning his first tournament in 2003 at the Izki Challenge de España and earning promotion to the European Tour for 2004. He spent a further seven seasons at this level, despite finishing three places shy of automatic qualification in his debut season and having to visit qualifying school. However, after a poor 2010 season, Erlandsson returned to the Challenge Tour in 2011.

Erlandsson's best finishes on the European Tour are a pair of runner-up placings in the 2005 Celtic Manor Wales Open and the 2009 Johnnie Walker Championship at Gleneagles. His best season was 2005, when he finished 67th on the Order of Merit.

On 10 September 2006, Erlandsson achieved a career highest world ranking of 248.

Professional wins (3)

Challenge Tour wins (1)

Nordic Golf League wins (1)

Swedish Golf Tour wins (1)

Results in major championships

Note: Erlandsson only played in The Open Championship.
"T" = tied

Team appearances
Amateur

Eisenhower Trophy (representing Sweden): 1996
St Andrews Trophy (representing the Continent of Europe): 1996

References

External links

Swedish male golfers
European Tour golfers
Sportspeople from Malmö
1974 births
Living people
20th-century Swedish people